Marilyn Olmstead was an American chemist, an expert in small molecule crystallography and an international leader in the crystallographic study of fullerenes, or "Buckyballs." She held the position of Professor Emerita of Chemistry at the University of California Davis.

She was elected as a Fellow of the American Chemical Society in 2014 and the American Crystallographic Association in 2017.

Early life 
Marilyn Olmstead was born on December 8, 1943 in Glendale, CA.  and  graduated from Burbank High School in 1961.

Higher education
Olmstead earned a B.A. in Chemistry from Reed College in 1965.  She attended University of Wisconsin-Madison for her graduate studies,  supported by a Woodrow Wilson Fellowship.  She received her Ph.D. in Chemistry from Wisconsin-Madison in 1969, the only woman in her graduating class of 40 students.

Career and discoveries 
Olmstead started at the Department of Chemistry of the University of California, Davis in 1969 as Lecturer in Chemistry (1969-1975) She wa subsequently appointed Postdoctoral Fellow (1971-1986), Staff Research Associate (X-ray Crystallography) (1986-1997), and Specialist (1997-2003). By 2000, she was the in charge of a crystallographic laboratory that was one of the most productive in the world; she herself had the highest number of publications and cites of anyone in the  Chemistry Department. Eventually, in 2003, when Marilyn was 60 years old, she was appointed to the faculty as full professor. She became a faculty member at the rank of Professor Step 2 in 2003, and advanced through the system to Professor, Step 6 in 2015.  She became emerita in 2015.

Olmstead  was a specialist in small molecule crystallography.    A focus of her research after 1990 was the structural characterization by X-ray crystallography of fullerenes, both empty and filled (endohedrals) cages, in collaboration with  Alan Balch. She contributed to many of the papers that described previously undetected higher fullerenes (larger than C70) (until 2018 when this record was broken) and endohedral fullerenes (those that contain encaged metals and small clusters).
 She pushed boundaries of crystallography, employing synchrotron radiation and ultra-low temperature data collection. Complementing her work on fullerenes and carbon nonocapsules, she also collaborated with  petroleum scientists to provide definitive structural characterization of a number of the large family of diamondoid hydrocarbons found in oil wells. Structure of [123]tetramantane, a new type of σ-helical structure based on a diamondoid (nanodiamond) framework, and the structure of the first fullerene that did not obey the Isolated pentagon rule. She was also responsible for the structural characterization of the first boron-centered radical.
 
Olmstead served as an original co-editor of the journal Acta Crystallographica Section E from 2001 to 2011. She  served in the elected positions of chair of the General Interest Group, and Chair of the Continuing Education Committee in  the American Crystallographic Association. She was a member of the Journal’s Commission of the International Union of Crystallography. She was an elected member of the U.S. National Committee on Crystallography, a branch of the National Academy of Sciences.

In 2014 Olmstead was elected a Fellow of the American Chemical Society. In 2017, she was elected a Fellow of the American Crystallographic Association.

Death
Marilyn Olmstead was killed on September 30, 2020 in a collision while cycling on a rural road north of Davis, California.

References 

1943 births
2020 deaths
American women chemists
Reed College alumni
University of Wisconsin–Madison alumni
People from Glendale, California
Fellows of the American Chemical Society
21st-century American women